The United States national rugby sevens team competes in international rugby sevens competitions. The national sevens team is organized by USA Rugby, and the team has been led by Head Coach Mike Friday since 2014.

The main competition the team plays in every year is the World Rugby Sevens Series, a series of ten tournaments played around the globe from December to June that includes the USA Sevens tournament every spring. The Eagles have been a core team in the World Series and finished in the top twelve each season since 2008–09. The Eagles' best season in the Sevens Series has been a second-place finish in the 2018–19 Series. The best result in a single Sevens tournament was first place, which they have accomplished three times — winning the 2015 London Sevens and the 2018 and 2019 USA Sevens.

The team also participates in major tournaments every four years, such as the Summer Olympics, the Rugby World Cup Sevens, and the Pan American Games. Their best finishes in quadrennial events include finishing ninth at the 2016 Olympics, finishing sixth at the 2018 Rugby World Cup Sevens, and winning bronze medals at the 2011 and 2015 Pan American Games.

The United States had traditionally used the sevens team to prepare players for the XV-side. Since January 2012, due to increased attention generated by rugby's return to the Olympics in 2016, the national sevens team has turned professional, with the team extending paid full-time contracts to its players. The national sevens team has drawn a number of crossover athletes from other sports, the most prominent examples being Perry Baker (American football) and Carlin Isles (track). The U.S. also sometimes fields a developmental team, the USA Falcons, in several tournaments.

History

The earliest records of an American national rugby sevens team are from the 1986 and 1988 Hong Kong Sevens, where a team named the American Eagles won the Plate Final. The team competed as the United States national rugby sevens team at the inaugural 1993 Rugby World Cup Sevens. The U.S. competed in nine of the ten tournaments in the inaugural 1999–2000 World Sevens Series.

World Rugby Sevens Series

The World Rugby Sevens Series, which is played every year from December through June, is the primary annual competition for the U.S. national sevens team.

Early years (1999–2011) 
The U.S. has competed in the World Series every year since the event's inaugural 1999–2000 season.  The U.S. had some initial success during the early years of the tournament led by Jovesa Naivalu, who held the record for most tries scored until broken by Zack Test. However, the U.S. struggled in the five seasons from 2002–03 through 2006–07.

The 2007–08 season was a turning point for the US team, qualifying for 6 of the 8 series tournaments, and defeating France and Samoa en route to placing sixth at the 2007 South Africa Sevens. The team was led by Chris Wyles who scored 26 tries on the season. The IRB rewarded the Eagles' success by promoting the U.S. to "core" team status for the 2008–09 season, meaning that the U.S. automatically plays in all 8 tournaments without having to go through qualifying rounds.

The 2008–09 season was a breakout season for the U.S., finishing 11th on the season.  The high point of the team's season was the home tournament, the 2009 USA Sevens. Nese Malifa's 30 points in that tournament helped the U.S. reach the semi-finals, their best result to that time on home soil.

The 2009–10 season saw continued improvement, with the team finishing the season in 10th place. Led by Matt Hawkins and Nese Malifa, the team finished ninth to win the Bowl in the 2010 USA Sevens. The U.S. then advanced to their first ever Cup final at the 2010 Adelaide Sevens, scoring upset wins against England, Wales and Argentina.

During the 2010–11 season the team took a small step back with a 12th-place finish. A number of key players were unavailable for most or all of the season, including the previous season's leading try scorer Nick Edwards and leading point scorer Nese Malifa. Additionally, a number of competing teams had moved to professional status, leaving the mostly amateur U.S. team struggling to keep pace.

Professional era begins (2011–2014) 

The 2011–12 season saw significant changes for the U.S. The team turned professional in January 2012, with contracts for up to 15 players. The change to professional status did not bring immediate improvement. Head coach Al Caravelli resigned, and Alex Magleby was selected as the new head coach. The US finished the 2011–12 season in 11th, a slight improvement over the previous season, even though the team did not reach the quarterfinals of any of the 9 tournaments. Bright spots for the season included the emerging leadership of Shalom Suniula (captain), Zack Test (team leading 21 tries) and Colin Hawley.

The 2012–13 Series saw a slightly different format, with 15 core teams instead of 12, but with the possibility of relegation for the teams that finished in the bottom three. The U.S. got off to a slow start, ranked last among the 15 core teams after the first two legs. The U.S. saw improvement, however, reaching the quarterfinals in five of the last seven tournaments, and finishing in the top 6 during the last three tournaments. The U.S. finished fifth to win the Plate Final at the 2013 Japan Sevens, the first time the U.S. had won a plate since 2001, and followed that feat by again finishing fifth to win the Plate Final at the 2013 Scotland Sevens, with Nick Edwards the leading try-scorer in the tournament with 8 tries. The U.S. finished the season in 11th place, and had two players among the season's top try-scorers:  Nick Edwards (20) and Zack Test (18). Coach Alex Magleby stepped down after the season.

The U.S. team fared poorly during the 2013–14 Series under new coach Matt Hawkins, finishing the season in 13th place. Once again, Zack Test led the team with 23 tries and 119 points on the season; other leading scorers included Carlin Isles with 17 tries, including six at the 2014 Wellington Sevens, and newcomer Madison Hughes with 34 goals scored. Hawkins was blamed for the exodus of several veteran players, such as Colin Hawley and Shalom Suniula, and was asked to step down at the end of the season.

Top 6 finishes (2014–present)

The U.S. had its best season ever in the 2014–15 Series under head coach Mike Friday, who was hired in summer 2014. The U.S. finished sixth in the series, its best finish to date. The team capped off the season by winning the 2015 London Sevens after defeating Australia in the cup final, the first time the U.S. has won a World Series tournament. Carlin Isles set a U.S. record with 32 tries for the season and Madison Hughes set a record with 296 points.

The U.S. began the 2015–16 Series by "shocking the world" when it defeated New Zealand for the first time at 2015 Dubai Sevens. The team beat the 12-time World Series champion in pool play and again in the tournament's third-place match before a third victory in as many matches in the 2015 South Africa Sevens Plate Semifinal. The U.S. once again finished the season in sixth, tying its best ever finish. The previous season's scoring records were broken again, as Perry Baker notched 48 tries and Madison Hughes scored 331 points.

The U.S. began the 2016-17 World Series slowly, sitting in 11th place after the first three rounds. The U.S. was missing certain key players from the previous season. The U.S. turned things around mid-season. In the second half of the season, the team for the first time reached four consecutive semifinals: first at the USA Sevens where the U.S. finished third; then at the Canada Sevens where Perry Baker scored 9 tries including his 100th career try; followed by Hong Kong and Singapore. The U.S. finished the season in fifth place overall, a record high for the team. Perry Baker was the season's leading try scorer (57) and points scorer (285) on the Series, whereas Madison Hughes ranked third in points (279). Perry Baker and Danny Barrett were both selected to the 2016-17 Dream Team, and Baker was selected as the 2017 World Rugby Sevens Player of the Year.

The 2017–18 season began badly for the U.S. In the first tournament in Dubai, Baker suffered a concussion, and the rest of the team limped to a last place finish. The U.S. improved from that point on, reaching the semifinals of the Australia Sevens. The team then won the 2018 USA Sevens, the first time the U.S. won their home tournament, boosted in large part by Perry Baker, who led all scorers with 8 tries; Baker, along with forwards Ben Pinkelman and Danny Barrett all made the tournament Dream Team. Overall the team displayed inconsistent performances, reaching the Cup semifinals three times, but also failing to qualify for the cup quarterfinals three times. Despite the inconsistent play, the U.S. finished sixth overall.

The U.S. got off to a strong start in the 2018–19 season. The team reached the finals in Dubai, South Africa, New Zealand, and Australia, the first time the U.S. had reached four consecutive finals and was ranked joint first in the overall Series after the first four legs. In the fifth leg, the U.S. won beating Samoa 27–0. This was the U.S.’s second straight USA Sevens win, giving them sole possession of first place in the Sevens World Series. The U.S. remained in first place for several more tournaments, but consecutive semifinal losses to Fiji in the last two tournaments in London and Paris meant that Fiji won the Series with the U.S. finishing second. The U.S. overall had its best season ever — the second place finish beating their previous best of fifth. Additionally, qualifying for five consecutive tournament finals as well as reaching the semifinals in all ten tournaments were U.S. records. Carlin Isles scored 52 tries, ranked first overall among all players.

The U.S. started slowly in the 2019–20 season; with the team resting some players who had played at the October 2019 Rugby World Cup, the team sat in eighth place after the first two events.

Season by season

*At the start of the 2016–17 season, the plate and shield awards were abandoned, with the bowl replaced by the Challenge Trophy. 
Updated as of 31 August 2022

Current team

The following table shows the leading players for the U.S. during the 2022–23 Sevens Series season.

Player pool
A pool of American full-time professional rugby players train year round at the Olympic Training Center in San Diego. The twelve players selected for tournament rosters are generally drawn from this training squad. For particularly high-profile tournaments such as the Olympics, the U.S. sometimes draws from American players who are playing rugby professionally abroad.

USA Rugby has since January 2012 provided full-time salaried contracts to players. Previously, players had been part-time semi-pro players paid a stipend for their participation. USA Rugby CEO Nigel Melville stated that a full-time sevens team is a crucial step as USA Rugby prepares for rugby's return to the Olympics in 2016.

The inclusion of rugby sevens in the Olympics had greatly expanded funding available to the sport in the U.S. The large pool of American football players who may be unable to earn professional contracts in the NFL meant there may be athletes with skills that could transfer to rugby union.

Coaches

Tournament history

Summer Olympics

Although the fifteens version of rugby union had last appeared in the Olympics at the 1924 Games, rugby sevens made its debut at the 2016 Olympics in Rio de Janeiro. The U.S. qualified for the 2016 Olympics by defeating Canada 21–5 in the final of the 2015 NACRA Sevens. At the 2016 Olympics, the U.S. went 1–2 in pool play, narrowly missing the quarterfinals due to a 14–17 loss to Argentina. The U.S. finished in ninth place, with Carlin Isles scoring six tries and Danny Barrett scoring four tries.

Rugby World Cup Sevens

The U.S. has participated in every Rugby World Cup Sevens since the tournament's inception in 1993. The team's best performance to date has been its sixth-place finish at the 2018 tournament, which was held on home soil.

Pan American Games

The U.S. has played rugby sevens at every Pan Am Games since the sport was introduced at the 2011 Games. At the 2011 Games, the U.S. lost 19–21 to Canada in the semifinals before defeating Uruguay 19–17 for the bronze. At the 2015 Games, the U.S. again lost to Canada 19–26 in the semifinals and defeated Uruguay 40–12 to capture their second consecutive bronze. At the 2019 Games, a weakened U.S. side that left its regular starters at home defeated Brazil 24–19 to take the bronze medal.

World Games

Regional qualifier tournaments
The U.S. has played in several North American regional tournaments, often as a qualifying tournament for the Rugby World Cup Sevens or another event.

Other international competitions

* – Played as the USA Cougars

Player records
The following tables show the U.S. career leaders in major statistical categories in the World Rugby Sevens Series.

Notes:
 These figures include only the World Rugby Sevens Series and do not include other events such as the Rugby World Cup Sevens.

Points

Tries

Matches

Tackles

Other notable players

 Jovesa Naivalu — played 1999–2008; was the U.S. record holder with 47 tries, until overtaken by Zack Test.
 Matt Hawkins – played 2007–2013; ranked #2 in tries scored with 56 at the time of his retirement.
 Nick Edwards — played 2009–15; scored 53 tries and was ranked #3 in tries scored at the end of his career.
 Chris Wyles — played 2007–2009; scored 44 tries and was ranked #2 in tries scored when he left USA 7s for professional rugby in England.

Player records (season)

Up to date as of 13 September 2022

Previous head coaches

 In 1998–99 the United States used a three-coach rotation scheme involving Gray, Russell, and Tyler.

Honors
These statistics are sourced from USA Rugby's Database:

Other Top Three Finishes
 2015 Pan American Games – Bronze Medal
 2015 NACRA Sevens – Champions
 2012 NACRA 7s – Runner-up
 2011 Pan American Games – Bronze Medal
 2008 NAWIRA RWC 7s Qualifier – Champions
 2006 Bangkok International Sevens – Champions
 2004 NAWIRA Championship – Champions

Plate Champions
 2007 Singapore Cricket Club International Rugby Sevens
 1988 Hong Kong Sevens 
 1986 Hong Kong Sevens 

Bowl Champions/Challenge Trophy/Challenge Cup
 2018 Singapore Sevens
 2018 New Zealand Sevens
 2016 Dubai Sevens
 2015 Japan Sevens
 2014 Gold Coast Sevens
 2011 Adelaide Sevens
 2010 USA Sevens
 2003 Hong Kong Sevens 
 2002 Chile Sevens 
 1997 Rugby World Cup Sevens 

Shield Champions
 2014 London Sevens
 2014 Wellington Sevens
 2014 USA Sevens
 2013 Gold Coast Sevens
 2011 USA Sevens 
 2011 Wellington Sevens
 2010 Wellington Sevens
 2009 Edinburgh Sevens 
 2009 Adelaide Sevens 
 2008 Dubai Sevens 
 2008 Wellington Sevens 
 2007 USA Sevens 
 2004 USA Sevens 
 2004 New Zealand Sevens

See also

 Rugby union in the United States
 United States national rugby union team
 United States national under-20 rugby union team
 United States women's national rugby sevens team
 USA Rugby

Notes

References

External links
 
WorldRugby profile

 
United States national rugby union team
national